Xyris jupicai, common name Richard's yelloweyed grass, is a New World species of flowering plants in the yellow-eyed-grass family. It is widespread in North America, South America, Mesoamerica, and the West Indies.

Xyris jupicai is a perennial herb up to 100 cm (40 inches) tall with grass-like leaves up to 60 cm (2 feet) long, and yellow flowers.

References

External links
Photo of herbarium specimen at Missouri Botanical Garden, collected in 1982 in State of Paraná in Brazil

jupicai
Plants described in 1792
Flora of the Southeastern United States
Flora of South America
Flora of Central America
Flora of the Caribbean
Flora of Texas
Flora of Oklahoma
Flora of New Jersey